Suso or Susso may refer to:

People
 Suso (footballer) (Jesús Joaquín Fernández Sáenz de la Torre) (born 1993), Spanish professional footballer
 Suso Santana, nicknamed Suso (born 1985), Spanish footballer
 Foday Musa Suso, Gambian griot and kora musician
 Jali Nyama Suso (1925–1991), Gambian kora musician
 Papa Susso, a Gambian kora musician
 Henry Suso (1295–1366), 14th-Century German mystic
 Suso de Toro (born 1956), Spanish writer
 Suso Cecchi d'Amico (1914–2010), Italian screenwriter

Organizations
 The Sydney University Symphony Orchestra
 The Stockholm Youth Symphony Orchestra (Swedish: Stockholms ungdoms symfoniorkester)

Other uses
 Suso (drink), carbonated fruit juice drink
 The Susso, an Australian slang term referring to "sustenance" (welfare) payments